Xiangmi Lake() is man-made recreational lake located in Futian District, Shenzhen, Guangdong.

History
Xiangmi Lake was established and opened to the public in 1966, which has fun, food and drink, and tourism.  At that time it bore the name Xiangmaochang Reservoir, which was extended to a small reservoir in 1978.

Transportation
 Take bus No. 44, 46, 65, 107, 108, 235 or 237 to Xiangmi Lake North Bus Stop
 Take subway Line 1 (Luobao Line) to get off at Xiangmi Station.

See also
 List of lakes and reservoirs in Shenzhen

References

External links

Lakes of Shenzhen
Tourist attractions in Shenzhen
1966 establishments in China
Futian District